The 2002–03 Liga Leumit season saw Maccabi Ahi Nazareth and Bnei Sakhnin promoted to the Israeli Premier League, the first time that two Arab clubs would appear in the top division (at the end of the season, the first Arab club to play in the top division, Hapoel Tayibe, folded).

Maccabi Kafr Kanna and Beitar Avraham Be'er Sheva were relegated to Liga Artzit.

Hapoel Ramat Gan qualified for the UEFA Cup after becoming the first club from outside the top division to win the State Cup. They remain the only club not in the top flight to play in Europe.

Final table

External links
Israel Second Level 2002/03 RSSSF

Liga Leumit seasons
Israel
2002–03 in Israeli football leagues